The 1996 BPR 4 Hours of Brands Hatch was the eighth round of the 1996 BPR Global GT Series season.

Results
Class winners in bold. Cars failing to complete 75% of winner's distance marked as Not Classified (NC).

1996 in British motorsport
1996 in the BPR Global GT Series